The BCIT School of Business + Media is a business school within the British Columbia Institute of Technology (BCIT). In 1965, the School of Business was founded and has campuses located in Burnaby and downtown Vancouver, British Columbia, Canada. Programs are accredited by the Accreditation Council for Business Schools and Programs.

History 
 1965 - BCIT is founded
 1986 - The Peter Thomson Centre for Venture Development is created
 1997 - The Downtown Vancouver campus opens
 2001 - Bell Canada Enterprises (BCE) donates $1.5 million to create the BCE New Media Centre of Excellence
 2014 - Centre of Excellence in Analytics is created
 2021 - BCIT and Vancouver International Airport's research lab opens

Programs
The BCIT School of Business + Media offers over 130 credentials that can be completed full-time, part-time, or online. Certificates ladder into diplomas, which ladder into degrees.

Diplomas
The School of Business + Media has over 20 diploma programs that cover a wide range of business and media specializations. Some of the specializations include accounting, media communications, business administration, digital arts, marketing, and project management. Diplomas are completed in two years full-time or course-by-course on a part-time basis.

Bachelor Degrees
BCIT offers Bachelor of Business Administration and Bachelor of Accounting degrees. Students must complete a BCIT diploma program to enroll into a degree program. Students can complete a bachelor degree within three years by completing a two year diploma program and one additional year of business studies. Degree students can complete an international student exchange for a term or year.

Graduate Certificates
BCIT offers three graduate certificate programs: Business Administration (full-time), Business Analytics (part-time) and Global Leadership (full-time).

Campuses

Burnaby Campus 
The Burnaby campus offers the majority of academic programing. Bachelor degrees, two year full-time diplomas, and part-time certificates are taught at the campus. The main campus is located at 3700 Willingdon Avenue, Burnaby.

Downtown Vancouver Campus 

The Downtown Vancouver campus offers part-time business courses. The BCIT Downtown Vancouver Campus is located at 555 Seymour Street, Vancouver.

BCIT Learning Model 
The BCIT School of Business + Media applied business education model prepares graduates for a business career. Students learn in a set of 25–30 other students during the year. Unlike universities, students are automatically enrolled in all of the courses required for that program once accepted into their program. Students maintain a heavy course load consisting of six to eight courses each semester. BCIT semesters are slightly longer than other local universities with the academic year ending in May and graduating in late June.

Business Consulting Projects 
Business Consulting Projects are 10–16 weeks in duration and provide students the opportunity to work in a consulting role for a real business. A Business Consulting Project is different from traditional co-op or internship programs, as students fill an outside consulting role for an organization.

Internships and Practicums 
During the final semester in the diploma programs, students participate in an internship or practicum. An internship program can help students apply their classroom knowledge in a work environment.

Advanced Placement and Prior Learning 

BCIT provides course credit and advanced placement into diploma and degree programs. In 2014, the BCIT School of Business + Media provided course credit to McDonald's managers who completed courses through McDonald's own corporate training program. In 2015, the Royal Canadian Legion, donated $830,000 to the School of Business to fund the BCIT Legion Military Skills Conversion Program. This program helps Canadian veterans and reservists convert their military skills and knowledge into a business credential.

Student Clubs

Students within the BCIT School of Business + Media operate a number of student clubs that compete in regional and international case competitions. The clubs organize industry networking events, guest speakers, and charitable endeavours. The following student clubs are a part of the BCIT School of Business:
 APICS
 BCIT Human Resources Association
 BCIT Financial Management Association (FMA)
 BCIT Finance Association 
 BCIT Marketing Association (BCITMA) - Student chapter of the American Marketing Association
 BCIT JDC West 
 BITMAN
 Enactus BCIT
 International Business Management
 Meeting Professionals International (MPI)
 Toastmasters International

International Programs

The BCIT School of Business + Media has international partnerships with over 20 business schools. It also organizes international field schools to Europe during the summer. BCIT students can spend a semester or year abroad by participating in an international student exchange. Dual degree programs are available for students to earn both a BCIT bachelor degree and an international bachelor degree simultaneously. International partnerships exist with the following schools:

 Aarhus University, Institute of Technology (Denmark)
 Artevelde University of Applied Sciences (Belgium)
 Bremen University of Applied Sciences (Germany)
 Ca' Foscari University of Venice (Italy)
 Coventry University (England)
 Fondazione CUOA (Italy)
 Griffith University (Australia)
 Helsinki Metropolia University of Applied Sciences (Finland)
 Inholland University of Applied Sciences (The Netherlands)
 International Christian University (Japan)
 International University of Languages and Media Milan (Italy)
 Kookmin University (South Korea)
 Leonard De Vinci Pole Universitaire (France)
 Linköping University (Sweden)
 Munich University of Applied Sciences (Germany)
 Ternopil National Economic University (Ukraine)
 Toulouse Business School (France)
 Toulouse Business School – Barcelona Campus (Spain)
 University of Applied Sciences and Arts Northwestern Switzerland (Switzerland)
 University of Applied Sciences Berlin (Germany)
 University of Applied Sciences of Vienna (Austria)
 University of Applied Sciences Upper Austria (Austria)
 University for Development (Chile)
 Del Rosario University (Colombia)
 University of Bologna (Italy)
 University of Gloucestershire (England)
 University of Northampton (England)

Notable alumni

 Colin Basran, Mayor of Kelowna
 TC Carling, VP, Hockey Administration, Entertainment & Content, Canucks Sports & Entertainment
 Arthur Griffiths, CEO, Griffiths Sports Ltd.
 Jill Krop, News Director and Station Manager, Global BC
 Mike Killeen, News Anchor, CTV
 Samantha Legge, President, Canada Wide Media
 Gloria Macarenko, New Anchor, CBC
 Clint Mahlman, COO, London Drugs
 Wynne Powell, CEO (retired), London Drugs
 John Shorthouse, Broadcaster, Sportsnet
 Tamara Taggart, News Anchor, CTV

See also 
British Columbia Institute of Technology

External links 

 BCIT School of Business + Media

References 

Business schools in Canada
British Columbia Institute of Technology
1965 establishments in Canada